St. Patrick's Park is the largest baseball park in the province of Newfoundland and Labrador. It is located in St. John's, Newfoundland and was built by American servicemen stationed in the province following the Second World War.  It hosted baseball at the 1977 Canada Games, and the Baseball Canada 2014 Senior Men's Canada Championships.

The park is currently run and used by St. John's Amateur Baseball Association for their senior and intermediate baseball leagues. The senior league currently has 5 teams: Holy Cross Crusaders, Feildians, Shamrocks, Gonzaga Vikings and The Knights. The intermediate league consists of Holy Cross Crusaders, Feildians, Shamrocks, Gonzaga Vikings, Knights, Generals.

St. Pat's is also home to both the senior and junior St. John's Capitals, which is the selects team for the St. John's Amateur Baseball Association.

References

Sports venues in St. John's, Newfoundland and Labrador
Baseball venues in Canada